George Sholto Gordon Douglas-Pennant, 2nd Baron Penrhyn (30 September 1836 – 10 March 1907), was a landowner who played a prominent part in the Welsh slate industry as the owner of the Penrhyn Quarry in North Wales.

Life
He was born at Linton Springs, Yorkshire, on 30 September 1836. He was the elder son of Edward Gordon Douglas (1800–1886), third son of The Hon. John Douglas, second son of James Douglas, 14th Earl of Morton. His mother, his father's first wife, was Juliana Isabella Mary (died 1842), eldest daughter and co-heiress of George Hay Dawkins-Pennant of Penrhyn Castle.  In 1841, the father, whose wife inherited vast property in North Wales, assumed the additional surname of Pennant by royal licence, and was raised to the peerage as Baron Penrhyn on 3 August 1866.

George was educated at Eton and Christ Church, Oxford. A project of entering the army was abandoned in deference to his father's wishes, but he always interested himself in military affairs. He was commissioned on 1 March 1860 as captain-commandant of the 1st (Carnarvon) Carnarvonshire Rifle Volunteer Corps, which was largely recruited from his family's Penrhyn Slate Quarry. A second unit was soon raised from Pennant employees and he was promoted to major in command of the 1st Administrative Battalion of Carnarvonshire Rifle Volunteers. He was later made Honorary Colonel of the 4th (Royal Carnarvon and Merioneth Militia) Battalion, Royal Welsh Fusiliers, a position that his father had also held.

In 1866 he was elected Conservative Member of Parliament for Caernarvonshire, and held the seat until 1868. Following this defeat his father sacked 80 quarrymen for failing to vote for him. He was again elected in 1874, but was defeated in 1880 by Watkin Williams, Q.C. 

He succeeded to the peerage on his father's death in 1886. Thenceforth he devoted the greater part of his time and energies to the management of the large property which came to the family through his mother. The Penrhyn Estate contained no less than 26,278 acres, with a rent-roll of £67,000, and the family owned the major slate quarry at Bethesda which, when fully employed and in former times of good trade, were estimated to produce £150,000 a year.

In his later years his father had allowed much of the management of the Bethesda slate quarries to pass into the hands of an elective committee of the men. In 1885, when the quarries were on the verge of bankruptcy, the son George was entrusted with full powers to reform their administration. One of his first actions was to repudiate the authority of the workmen's committee. Under fresh and strenuous management the quarries once again became busy and prosperous. A great strike began in 1897 with Lord Penrhyn replying by closing the quarries. An angry debate took place in the House of Commons but Lord Penrhyn would abate none of his conditions, and the men capitulated.

As an opponent of trade unionism, Lord Penrhyn refused to allow the intervention of outsiders in dealings with his men, and late in 1900 a second general strike began, known as the Great Strike. The quarries were again closed, but were re-opened after a prolonged stoppage with 600 of the former non-union workmen. Penrhyn refused to re-engage the ringleaders or to recognise any trade union officials. On 9 August 1901, Robert Thomas Jones, raised a discussion as a matter of urgent public importance on the conduct of the local magistrates in requisitioning cavalry for maintaining peace in the district, but Penrhyn's position was unaffected. On 13 March 1903, he brought an action for libel against William John Parry, in respect of an article in the Clarion, accusing him of cruelty to his workmen; he received £500 damages and costs. Penrhyn acted throughout in accordance with what he believed to be stern equity and from a wish to obtain justice for non-union men. In 1907, he gave his workmen a bonus of 10 per cent on their wages, owing to a spell of bad weather which had interrupted work at the quarries.

Fond of horse-racing and breeding, he was elected to the Jockey Club in 1887, but was not very fortunate on the turf. 
In 1898, however, he won the Goodwood Cup with King's Messenger, which both in 1899 and 1900 carried his master's colours to the post for the Great Metropolitan Handicap at Epsom. With another horse, Quaesitum, in 1894 he won both the Chester Cup and the Queen's Vase. He was an excellent shot, but derived his chief enjoyment from fishing, in which he was exceptionally skilled. He was master of the Grafton hounds from 1882 to 1891.

Lord Penrhyn was a deputy-lieutenant for Carnarvonshire and was a county councillor for the Llandegai division of the county.

He died on 10 March 1907 aged 70 at his town residence, Mortimer House, Halkin Street, London SW1, and was buried near one of his country residences, Wicken, Stony Stratford.

Family
Lord Penryhn was married twice. On 23 August 1860 he married Pamela Blanche Rushout (1839–1870), daughter of Sir Charles Rushout Rushout, 2nd Baronet, with whom he had one son and six daughters, including Violet Douglas-Pennant. On 21 October 1875 he married Gertrude Jessy Glynne (d. 1940), daughter of the Rev. Henry Glynne and great-niece of the Liberal Prime Minister William Ewart Gladstone. With his second wife he had two sons, who both died in the First World War (Lt. Charles Douglas-Pennant, who died on 29 October 1914, aged 37, while serving with 1st Battalion, Coldstream Guards; and Capt. George Henry Douglas-Pennant, who died on 11 March 1915, aged 38, while serving with the King's Company, 1st Battalion, Grenadier Guards) and six daughters, including Margaret, who married General Sir Augustus Francis Andrew Nicol Thorne.

References

Attribution

External links 
 

1836 births
1907 deaths
People educated at Eton College
Alumni of Christ Church, Oxford
2
George
Carnarvon Militia officers
UK MPs 1865–1868
UK MPs 1874–1880
Penrhyn, B2
Conservative Party (UK) MPs for Welsh constituencies
George Douglas-Pennant, 2nd Baron Penrhyn
Deputy Lieutenants of Caernarvonshire
Eldest sons of British hereditary barons